The 1885–86 Football Association Challenge Cup was the 15th edition of the FA Cup, England's oldest football tournament. There were 130 entrants, sixteen more than in the previous season, although six teams did not play a match. Five Scottish clubs entered but one was eliminated in the first round in an all-Scottish tie and travel constraints caused the rest to withdraw.

Blackburn Rovers became the second team to win the competition in three successive seasons and, as of 2022, they remain the last to do so. The final between Blackburn and West Bromwich Albion is the earliest to have been contested by two extant clubs that are still members of either the Premier League or the English Football League.

First round
Notes. In all rounds, a walkover means the tie was not played and the first-named team progressed to the next round. If a match was declared void for any reason, a replay was necessary.

Replays

Second replays

Second round

Replays

Third round

Replay

Fourth round

Fifth round

Replay

Second replay

Sixth round

Semi-finals

Final

Replay

References

 FA Cup Results Archive
 The Complete Record of the FA Cup by Mike Collett (2003). SportsBooks Ltd, Cheltenham.

1885-86
1885–86 in English football
FA Cup